Rash is a surname. Notable people with the surname include:

Jim Rash (born 1971), American actor
Rodney Rash (1959–1996), American horse trainer
Ron Rash (born 1953), American poet, short story writer, and novelist
Sean Rash (born 1982), American bowling player
Steve Rash, American film director
Michael S. Rash Jr., Business Investor and Owner